Keith Allen Lyle (born April 17, 1972) is a former American football safety in the National Football League.  He was drafted by the Los Angeles Rams in the third round of the 1994 NFL Draft.  He played college football at Virginia.

Lyle also played for the Washington Redskins and San Diego Chargers.

Early years
In high school, he played quarterback and safety for George C. Marshall High School, in Falls Church, Virginia.  Keith's father Garry Lyle played for the Chicago Bears from 1967 to 1974.

Professional career
From 1995 to 1998, Lyle intercepted 23 passes, the most in the NFL during that period. Lyle was also the last first-round selection of the L.A. era of the Rams until 2016. During the 1996 NFL season, Lyle, along with Tyrone Braxton of the Denver Broncos, led the NFL in interceptions with nine.  Throughout his career with the Rams, Lyle also served as the team's holder. During his time with the Rams, Lyle started in 89 of 105 games.

NFL statistics

References

1972 births
Living people
Players of American football from Washington, D.C.
American football safeties
Virginia Cavaliers football players
Los Angeles Rams players
St. Louis Rams players
Washington Redskins players
San Diego Chargers players